Daniel Rowden (born 9 September 1997) is an English middle-distance runner specialising in the 800 metres. He won a silver medal at the 2017 European U23 Championships.

He became British champion when winning the 800 metres event at the 2020 British Athletics Championships in a time of 1 min 45.94 secs.

International competitions

Personal bests
Outdoor
400 metres – 48.48 (Lee Valley 2015)
800 metres – 1:44.09 (Zagreb 2020)
1500 metres – 3:54.65 (Watford 2017)

References

1997 births
Living people
English male middle-distance runners
British male middle-distance runners
British Athletics Championships winners
Athletes (track and field) at the 2020 Summer Olympics
Olympic athletes of Great Britain